Joe Henderson (born March 6, 1986 in Birmingham, Alabama) is a professional gridiron football linebacker for the Calgary Stampeders of the Canadian Football League. Henderson originally signed as a free agent with the BC Lions on April 22, 2010 and spent two seasons with the team. Following his release late in the 2011 season, he signed with the Stampeders on February 8, 2012. He played college football for the Alabama-Birmingham Blazers. He was released on June 18, 2012.

References

1986 births
Living people
African-American players of Canadian football
Players of Canadian football from Birmingham, Alabama
BC Lions players
Canadian football linebackers
21st-century African-American sportspeople
20th-century African-American people